The Strong is an epithet for the following:

 Ale the Strong, a mythological king of Sweden
 Augustus II the Strong (1670–1733), Elector of Saxony (as Frederick Augustus I) and King of Poland and Grand Duke of Lithuania (as Augustus II)
 Leopold of Styria (died 1129), Margrave of Styria
 Magnus the Strong (1106–1134), Danish duke, possibly also king of Sweden
 Raud the Strong, Norse Seid priest and warrior in the late tenth century
 Robert the Strong (820–866), Margrave in Neustria
 Sancho II of Castile and León (1036/1038–1072), King of Castile, Galicia and León
 Sancho VII of Navarre (1154–1234), King of Navarre
 Stefan Dušan (1308–1355), King and Emperor of Serbia
 Styrbjörn the Strong, a Viking rebel in Norse sagas who may have been slain in the 980s

See also
 Stefan Uroš V (1336-1371), ruler of the Serbian Empire known as Uroš Nejaki ("the Weak")
 Henry IV of Castile (1425–1474), King of Castile nicknamed "the Impotent"

Lists of people by epithet